Puerto Rico Highway 805 (PR-805) is an east–west road located in Corozal, Puerto Rico. It extends from its intersection with PR-568 near the Cuchillas boundary, passing through Negros barrio until its junction with PR-803 in Palos Blancos area.

Major intersections

See also

 List of highways numbered 805

References

External links
 

805
Roads in Corozal, Puerto Rico